The Austrian Mixed Curling Championship is the national championship of mixed curling in Austria. Team are composed of two men and two women, playing in alternating positions up the team, meaning the lead and third must be of the same gender, and likewise the second and fourth players. The championship has been held annually since 2005. It is organized by the Austrian Curling Association.

List of champions and medallists
(Team line-up in order: skip (marked bold), third, second, lead, alternate(s), coach)

References

See also
Austrian Men's Curling Championship
Austrian Women's Curling Championship
Austrian Mixed Doubles Curling Championship
Austrian Junior Curling Championships

Curling competitions in Austria

National curling championships
Recurring sporting events established in 2005
2005 establishments in Austria
Curling
Austria
Annual sporting events in Austria